The 1985 Stella Artois Championships was a men's tennis tournament played on grass courts at the Queen's Club in London, United Kingdom that was part of the 1985 Nabisco Grand Prix circuit. It was the 83rd edition of the tournament and ran from 10 June until 17 June 1985. Boris Becker, who was seeded 11th, won the singles title.

Finals

Singles

 Boris Becker defeated  Johan Kriek 6–2, 6–3
 It was Becker's 1st singles title of his career.

Doubles

 Ken Flach /  Robert Seguso defeated  Pat Cash /  John Fitzgerald 3–6, 6–3, 16–14
 It was Flach's 4th title of the year and the 10th of his career. It was Seguso's 4th title of the year and the 10th of his career.

References

External links
 Official website
 ATP tournament profile

 
Queen's Club Championships
Stella Artois Championships
Stella Artois Championships
Stella Artois Championships
Stella Artois Championships